Aulnoye-Aymeries station (French: Gare de Aulnoye-Aymeries) is a railway station serving the town Aulnoye-Aymeries, Nord department in the Hauts-de-France region of France. It is situated on the Creil–Jeumont railway and the Fives–Hirson railway.

Services

The station is served by regional trains to Charleville-Mézières, Valenciennes, Saint-Quentin, Maubeuge, Mons and Lille.

References

Railway stations in Nord (French department)
Railway stations in France opened in 1855